"Outstanding" is a song originally performed by the Gap Band and written by member Raymond Calhoun. The song originally appeared on the group's platinum-selling 1982 album Gap Band IV. It is one of their signature songs and biggest hits, reaching the number one spot on the U.S. R&B Singles Chart in February 1983.  "Outstanding" peaked at number 51 on the Billboard Hot 100.

Chart positions

Cover versions
The song was later covered by British singer Kenny Thomas in 1990. It reached number 12 on the UK Singles Chart. In 1999, footballer Andy Cole signed to WEA/Warner Music and released his version of "Outstanding" with added rap verses. Cole's version reached number 68 on the UK Singles Chart.

References

External links

Outstanding - list of releases at Discogs.

The Gap Band songs
1982 songs
1982 singles
1990 singles
Kenny Thomas (singer) songs
Cooltempo Records singles
Warner Music Group singles
1999 singles
Funk ballads
1980s ballads